Michael Patrick Lynch is Professor of Philosophy at the University of Connecticut. He is also the director of the University of Connecticut Humanities Institute. As director of the Humanities Institute, he has headed a Templeton-funded project on humility and conviction in public life.

Career
Lynch's early work focused on his pluralist theory of truth. He holds that truth is a functional property, i.e. that it is characterized by a particular function that can be realized in many different ways. For instance, some truths might realize truth's function by corresponding to reality while others might do so by cohering with a larger set of propositions. His work on the value of truth has also attracted attention, including critical reactions from philosophers ranging from Marian David to Richard Rorty.

Lynch has also worked on epistemology, especially epistemological issues related to big data and democracy. Lynch argues for the importance of intellectual humility in democracy.

Writing
Lynch is the author of Truth in Context (MIT Press, 1998), True to Life (MIT Press, 2004), Truth as One and Many (OUP, 2009), In Praise of Reason (MIT, 2012), and The Internet of Us: Knowing More and Understanding Less in the Age of Big Data (Liveright Publishing, 2016) as well as many professional philosophical articles. He was editor of the volume The Nature of Truth: Classic and Contemporary Perspectives (Bradford Books, 2001), co-editor with Professor Heather Battaly of the volume Perspectives on the Philosophy of William P. Alston (Rowman & Littlefield, 2005), as well as co-editor with Professor Patrick Greenough of the volume Truth and Realism (OUP, 2006).

Lynch won the Orwell Award in 2019 for his book Know-It-All Society: Truth and Arrogance in Political Culture.

References

20th-century American male writers
20th-century American philosophers
21st-century American male writers
21st-century American philosophers
Analytic philosophers
Living people
University of Connecticut faculty
Year of birth missing (living people)